The Cathedral Basilica of Our Lady of the Elevation Also Ambato Cathedral is the name that receives a religious building that belongs to the Catholic Church and is located between Bolivar and Montalvo streets in front of the Juan Montalvo Park of the city of Ambato capital of the province of Tungurahua in the center of the South American country of Ecuador. It has the distinction of Minor Basilica since April 1961.

Its history goes back to 1698 when the original chapel was built that was destroyed by the earthquake of 1797. It was in 1954 when the present temple was inaugurated in replacement of another structure affected by a new earthquake in 1949. The church follows the Roman or Latin rite and is the seat of the Diocese of Ambato (Dioecesis Ambatensis) that was created in 1948 by Pope Pius XII through the bull Quae ad maius.

It is under the pastoral responsibility of Bishop Jorge Giovanny Pazmiño Abril.

See also
Roman Catholicism in Ecuador
Our Lady Church

References

Roman Catholic cathedrals in Ecuador
Basilica churches in Ecuador
Roman Catholic churches completed in 1954
Ambato, Ecuador
20th-century Roman Catholic church buildings in Ecuador